Lucien Faucheux (26 August 1899 – 22 July 1980) was a French cyclist. He competed in the men's team pursuit event at the 1920 Summer Olympics.

References

External links
 

1899 births
1980 deaths
French male cyclists
Olympic cyclists of France
Cyclists at the 1920 Summer Olympics
Cyclists from Paris